Champs may refer to:

Music
 The Champs, a U.S. instrumental music group
 Champs (Brazilian band), a Brazilian boy band
 Champs (British band), a British folk- and indie rock-influenced band
 The Fucking Champs, a U.S. progressive heavy metal band previously known as The Champs
 "Champs", a song on Wire's 1977 album Pink Flag

Places in France
 Champs, Aisne, in the Aisne département 
 Champs, Orne, in the Orne département
 Champs, Puy-de-Dôme, in the Puy-de-Dôme département 
 Champs-Romain, in the Dordogne département
 Champs-sur-Marne, in the Seine-et-Marne département 
 Champs-sur-Tarentaine-Marchal, in the Cantal département 
 Champs-sur-Yonne, in the Yonne département 
 Les Champs-de-Losque, in the Calvados département
 Champs-Élysées, literally the "Elysian fields", a broad avenue in Paris

Sport
 Champs (brand), a Brazilian sporting goods manufacturer
 Mumbai Champs, a cricket team from the Indian Cricket League
 Champs Sports, a subsidiary of Foot Locker, Inc.

Other
 CHAMPS (China) (Chongqing, Hefei, Anshan, Ma'anshan, Pingdingshan and Shenyang)
 Champs (film), a 2014 documentary film
 Champs (TV series), an American sitcom
 CHAMPS Project, a project aimed at improving education in Mississippi, U.S.
 Charter High School of the Arts (CHAMPS), a performing arts high school in Van Nuys, California

See also
 Champ (disambiguation)
 Champion (disambiguation)